The Marigold Aphid, (Neotoxoptera oliveri), is an aphid in the superfamily Aphidoidea in the order Hemiptera. It is a true bug and sucks sap from plants.

References 

 http://aphid.aphidnet.org/Neotoxoptera_oliveri.php
 http://bie.ala.org.au/species/urn:lsid:biodiversity.org.au:afd.taxon:36598a3b-8bcb-4b90-b93b-a5453d5f5da0
 http://aphid.speciesfile.org/Common/basic/Taxa.aspx?TaxonNameID=1943
 http://www.forestryimages.org/browse/subthumb.cfm?sub=62481

Agricultural pest insects
Insects described in 1935
Macrosiphini